The 2016–17 Macedonian Third Football League was the 25th season of the third-tier football league in the Republic of Macedonia, since its establishment.

North

Teams

Table

South

Teams

Table

East

Teams

Table

West

Teams

Table

Southwest

Teams

Table

Promotion play-offs

For Second League - East

For Second League - West

See also 
 2016–17 Macedonian Football Cup
 2016–17 Macedonian First Football League
 2016–17 Macedonian Second Football League

References 

Macedonian Third Football League seasons
Macedonia 3
3